Lewin's Cove is a town in the Canadian province of Newfoundland and Labrador. The town had a population of 546 in the Canada 2021 Census.

Lewin's Cove is located just outside the Burin town limits. Burin provides Lewin's Cove water supply and fire services.

Demographics 

See also
 Burin Peninsula
 List of cities and towns in Newfoundland and Labrador

References 

Towns in Newfoundland and Labrador